Dolly is a rock band from Nantes, France. The group is popular in France but less well-known elsewhere. Dolly's vocalist Emmanuelle Monet has appeared in many collaborations, including a song together with Apocalyptica on the single "Wie weit/How far/En Vie". Dolly stopped their activity indefinitely after the death of Michaël Chamberlin in a car accident on 25 May 2005.

History 
Dolly was originally formed by Emmanuelle Monet, Thierry Lacroix and Michaël Chamberlin in 1989 under the name of Dollybird. 1991 they changed their name to Dolly & Co and made their debut album which was also named Dolly & Co. The actual Dolly was not born until Nicolas Bonnière joined the band in 1995. The name was then changed to Dolly.
Emmanuelle Monet has now reformed her band with a new bassist, under the name of "Manu".

Members 
Manu (Emmanuelle Monet) - vocals, guitar
Thierry (Thierry Lacroix) - drums
Nico (Nicolas Bonnière) - Guitar (1995–present)

Former members 
Micka (Michaël Chamberlin) - bass (1989 - † 2005 at the age of 36 years)

Discography 
Dolly (April 1997) (released in both French and English versions)
Un jour de rêves (August 1999)
Sunday Afternoon (2000) (the only English album of the band)
Plein air (April 2002)
Tous des stars (2004)

External links 
Official site (The group has ceased to maintain their web site. The last version from May 24, 2006 can be seen here (via Internet Archive))
Dolly's discography on their own site (Flash site, in French) (Last version via Internet Archive)
Dolly's biography on their own site (Flash site, in French) (Last version via Internet Archive)

Sources 
 RFI music - Dolly biography
 RFI musique - Dolly biographie
 Rockmuzik - Dolly biographie (in French)
 W-Frenc.org - Dolly (in French)

Notes 

Musical groups from Pays de la Loire
French rock music groups